Ocean Breakers (Swedish: Bränningar) is a 1935 Swedish drama film directed by Ivar Johansson and starring Ingrid Bergman, Sten Lindgren and Tore Svennberg. The film's sets were designed by the art director Arne Åkermark.  It is also known by the alternative title The Surf.

Cast
 Ingrid Bergman as Karin Ingman  
 Sten Lindgren as Daniel Nordeman  
 Tore Svennberg as Anders Nordeman 
 Bror Olsson as Reverend  
 Carl Ström as Lars Ingman, Karin's father  
 Weyler Hildebrand as Per  
 Knut Frankman as Mr. Strömblom  
 Carin Swensson as Brita Strömblom  
 Georg Skarstedt as Olle  
 Henning Ohlsson as Karl-Johan 
 Wiktor Andersson as Barker at amusement park  
 Carl Browallius as Professor  
 Sven-Eric Gamble as Boy who fights Stig  
 Olle Granberg as Stig Ingman  
 Vera Lindby as Hilma  
 Holger Löwenadler as Doctor  
 Erik Rosén as Head Physician

References

Bibliography 
 Chandler, Charlotte. Ingrid: Ingrid Bergman, A Personal Biography. Simon and Schuster, 2007.

External links 
 

1935 films
1935 drama films
Swedish drama films
1930s Swedish-language films
Swedish black-and-white films
Films directed by Ivar Johansson
1930s Swedish films